David Allison Radcliff (born May 1, 1934) is an American swimmer who represented the United States at the 1956 Summer Olympics in Melbourne, Australia.  Radcliffe competed in the preliminary heats of the men's 1,500-meter freestyle, recording a time of 19:09.6.

In 1995, Radcliff returned to competition as a Masters swimmer. , he holds 42 individual U.S. Masters Swimming records in pool events; he holds all freestyle world records for the 75-79 and 80-84 age groups, from 50m to 1500m, other than the long course 50m freestyle. His 1500m freestyle World Record time at age 80 was 22:16.90, only 3 minutes slower than his time in the 1956 Olympics.

References

1934 births
Living people
American male freestyle swimmers
California Golden Bears men's swimmers
Olympic swimmers of the United States
Sportspeople from Spokane, Washington
Swimmers at the 1956 Summer Olympics